ʿAlā ad-Dīn Fīrūz Shāh was the son and successor of Sultan Nasiruddin Nasrat Shah of Bengal. He served as a governor of Chittagong during his father's reign, and was a patron of Bengali literature. Firuz Shah ascended the throne in 1533, though it was not unanimously recognised by all the nobles of Bengal. The conflict with the Ahom kingdom continued during his reign and the Bengali army led by Turbak Khan had reached as far as Kaliabor. Within three months as Sultan, Firuz Shah was assassinated by his uncle, who succeeded him as Sultan Ghiyasuddin Mahmud Shah.

Early life and background
Firuz was born in the Sultanate of Bengal to an aristocratic Bengali Sunni Muslim family known as the Hussain Shahi dynasty. His father, Nasiruddin Nasrat Shah, was a son of Sultan Alauddin Husain Shah of Bengal and a son-in-law of Sultan Ibrahim Lodi of Delhi. From an early age, Firuz was an admirer of Bengali literature. As a royal prince and governor of Chittagong, Firuz requested a writer known as Dvija Sridhara to compose the Vidya-Sundar love story in Bengali poetry form. which was completed later during his reign. Sridhara continuously praised Firuz in the poem for his good manners and wisdom.

Reign
Sultan Nusrat Shah was assassinated by a eunuch when returning from a visit to the tomb of his father, Alauddin Husain Shah. Following his death, the throne was contested between his son, Firuz, and his brother, Mahmud. Mahmud had served as an ameer during his brother's reign and the 20th-century historian Jadunath Sarkar suggests that Mahmud was the heir apparent due to his early usage of royal insignia. Nevertheless, the nobles of the Sultanate including Mahmud's brother-in-law Makhdum Alam, the Governor of North Bihar, installed Firuz Shah to the throne.

On the first day of Ramadan 939 AH (27 March 1533), a congregational mosque was built in Kalna, Burdwan by Ulugh Masnad Khan, who was Firuz Shah's governor, commander and minister. Within the space of three months, Firuz Shah was assassinated by his uncle, Mahmud, who succeeded him as the Sultan of Bengal.

Legacy
The Riyaz-us-Salatin, written by Ghulam Husain Salim in 1787, was the first history of Bengal which mentioned Firuz Shah, with his name being absent from the earlier chronicles, such as those written by Firishta and Nizamuddin Ahmad. Though Salim's source is unknown, a century later, Heinrich Blochmann publicised the inscription adjacent to the Kalna Shahi Mosque which commemorated the mosque's construction by Ulugh Masnad Khan. During this time, the mosque was still in use and its guardians were known to have held large bighas of land. Coins from Firuz Shah's reign were also found which are now kept in the British Museum.

See also
List of rulers of Bengal
History of Bengal
History of Bangladesh
History of India

References

Bibliography

Year of death unknown
Assassinated royalty
Year of birth unknown
16th-century Indian monarchs
1533 deaths
Hussain Shahi dynasty
16th-century Bengalis
Rulers of Chittagong